Govind Nihalani (born 19 December 1940) is an Indian film director, cinematographer, screenwriter and producer, known for his works in Hindi cinema. He has been the recipient of six National Film Awards, and five Bollywood Filmfare Awards. In 1996, his script for Drohkaal was adapted by Kamal Haasan for its Tamil remake, Kuruthipunal, which subsequently became India's official entry for the 68th Academy Awards Best Foreign Language Film category.

His first directorial venture was Aakrosh, starring Om Puri, Naseeruddin Shah, Smita Patil and Amrish Puri. The film was scripted by noted Marathi playwright Vijay Tendulkar. The film shared the Golden Peacock for best film at the International Film Festival of India held in New Delhi in 1981.
 He then directed Ardh Satya, based on a story by S. D. Panwalkar. The film has received critical reception for depicting the police-politician-criminal nexus. In 1997, he adapted Bengali novelist Mahasweta Devi's acclaimed novel by the same name to Hazaar Chaurasi Ki Maa.

Early life and career 
Nihalani was born on 19 December 1940 in Karachi, Sindh province (now in Pakistan) and his family migrated to India during the partition of 1947. 
He started out as a cinematographer, graduating in cinematography from the Shree Jaya Chamrajendra polytechnic (the present Government Film and Television Institute) in Bangalore in 1962. He was an Assistant Cinematographer to the legendary V. K. Murthy. He was associated with all the earlier films of Shyam Benegal and with the cinematography of Richard Attenborough's Oscar-winning epic Gandhi. Nihalani and Benegal are well known for their socially relevant films.

Literary works
 Encyclopaedia of Hindi Cinema, by Govind Nihalani, Saibal Chatterjee, Gulzar. Popular Prakashan, 2003.

Awards
Civilian honor
Padma Shri (2002)

National Film Awards
National Film Award for Best Cinematography - Junoon (1979)
National Film Award for Best Feature Film in Hindi (director) - Aakrosh (1980)
National Film Award for Best Feature Film in Hindi (director)  - Ardh Satya (1983)
National Film Award for Best Feature Film in Hindi (director)  - Drishti (1990)
National Film Award for Best Feature Film in Hindi (director) - Hazaar Chaurasi Ki Maa (1998)
Nargis Dutt Award for Best Feature Film on National Integration - Tamas (1988)

Filmfare Awards
Filmfare Best Cinematographer Award- Junoon (1979)
Filmfare Best Cinematographer Award- Vijeta (1983)
Filmfare Best Director Award - Aakrosh (1981)
Filmfare Best Movie Award - Ardh Satya (1984)
Filmfare Best Director Award - Ardh Satya (1984)
Filmfare Critics Award for Best Movie - Dev (2004)

Filmography

References

External links 
Nihalani's official site
 

1940 births
Living people
Filmfare Awards winners
Hindi-language film directors
Hindi film producers
Hindi film cinematographers
Indian television directors
Best Cinematography National Film Award winners
Recipients of the Padma Shri in arts
People from Karachi
Sindhi people
20th-century Indian film directors
Indian male screenwriters
Directors who won the Best Film on National Integration National Film Award